Xanthoparmelia stenophylla is a species of foliose lichen in the family Parmeliaceae.

It is a known host species to the lichenicolous fungus Lichenostigma cosmopolites.

See also
 List of Xanthoparmelia species

References

stenophylla
Lichen species
Lichens described in 1803
Fungi of India
Taxa named by Erik Acharius